Lieutenant-Colonel Francis William Voelcker  (9 October 1896 – 22 May 1954) was a British army officer and colonial administrator.

Biography
Born in London in 1896, Voelcker attended Shrewsbury School before joining the Sandhurst Military Academy in 1914. After the outbreak of World War I he was assigned to the King's Shropshire Light Infantry and went to fight in Belgium in 1915, where he was taken prisoner by the German army. During his three-and-a-half years as a POW, he escaped from three camps. After the war he was awarded the Military Cross. He continued his military service, initially serving in Ireland in 1919, before going to Aden. He was subsequently transferred to India in 1921. Whilst there he married Norah Hodgson in 1924, with whom he had two daughters.

In 1928 he left the army and moved to New Zealand, settling in Kerikeri, where he grew citrus fruits. However, during World War II he re-entered military service, commanding the Third Battalion, Fiji Regiment during the Solomon Islands campaign. He was awarded the Bronze Star Medal by the United States in 1944 for his actions during the campaign, and was later given the Distinguished Service Order.

In 1946 he was appointed Administrator of Western Samoa. Following constitutional amendments, he became High Commissioner two years later. He was made a CBE in the 1949 Birthday Honours, before stepping down in 1949. After returning to New Zealand, he served in Korea as part of the United Nations Korean Reconstruction Agency until being invalided in 1953.

He died at his home in Auckland on 22 May 1954 at the age of 58.

References

1896 births
Military personnel from London
People educated at Shrewsbury School
Graduates of the Royal Military College, Sandhurst
British Army personnel of World War I
British emigrants to New Zealand
New Zealand farmers
Commanders of the Order of the British Empire
Recipients of the Military Cross
Administrators of the Western Samoa Trust Territory
Members of the Legislative Council of Samoa
Members of the Legislative Assembly of Samoa
1954 deaths
King's Shropshire Light Infantry soldiers
British World War I prisoners of war
World War I prisoners of war held by Germany
British military personnel of the Irish War of Independence
Fijian military personnel of World War II
Companions of the Distinguished Service Order
United Nations military personnel